The P. D. Houston Jr. House is a historic mansion in Forest Hills, Tennessee.  Also known as Woods Cote, it was built in 1941 for P. D. Houston Jr., a banker who became the president of the First American National Bank in 1957. It was designed in the Tudor Revival architectural style by Warfield and Keeble. It was purchased by Norris H. Nielsen and his wife Britton in 1972. It has been listed on the National Register of Historic Places since October 27, 2003.

References

Houses on the National Register of Historic Places in Tennessee
Tudor Revival architecture in the United States
Houses completed in 1941
Buildings and structures in Davidson County, Tennessee
1941 establishments in Tennessee